Santa Ana National Wildlife Refuge is a  National Wildlife Refuge situated along the banks of the Rio Grande, south of Alamo in the Lower Rio Grande Valley, in Hidalgo County, South Texas.

The wildlife refuge was established for the protection of migratory birds in 1943. Its unique location is at the meeting of different climates and habitats: subtropical wetlands, Chihuahuan Desert, Gulf Coast, and Great Plains. Its riparian location has developed a reputation for diverse birding.

Due to its location near the Mexico–United States border, this wildlife refuge is threatened by the Trump wall.

Fauna

Notable species among the fauna in the refuge include the Texas ocelot (Leopardus pardalis albescens) and Gulf Coast jaguarundi (Puma yagouaroundi cacomitli) feline species.

Both species are listed as endangered in the Endangered Species Act of 1973, as Amended. The Texas ocelot is listed in the Convention on International Trade in Endangered Species of Wild Fauna and Flora (CITES) Appendix I and the Gulf Coast jaguarundi (seen at left) is listed in the CITES Appendix II.

While not considered endangered by the International Union for Conservation of Nature (IUCN), these species are acknowledged as rare for the area.

Birds

397 bird species have been documented within the park's borders. Many of those are migratory species on their way to and from Central and South America.

A few species to be found there are black-bellied whistling-duck,
fulvous whistling-duck, mottled duck, blue-winged teal, green-winged teal, cinnamon teal, least grebe, anhinga, tricolored heron, white ibis, lesser yellowlegs, long-billed dowitcher, and least tern.

Osprey, broad-winged hawk, northern harrier, and peregrine falcon are among the migratory birds of prey found in the refuge. Hook-billed kite and gray hawk, seen occasionally in the refuge, attract birders from around the world.

More than 35 species of New World warblers have been seen, including the golden-winged warbler, magnolia warbler, Northern parula, tropical parula, American redstart, palm warbler, and yellow-breasted chat.

Butterflies

Santa Ana is home to almost half of all butterfly species found in the United States. More than 300 species of butterflies have been observed at the refuge, with as many as 65 having been seen on a single day.

References

External links
Fws.gov: Official Santa Ana National Wildlife Refuge website
Texas Parks and Wildlife: Santa Ana NWR trails

National Wildlife Refuges in Texas
Protected areas of Hidalgo County, Texas
Lower Rio Grande Valley
Wetlands of Texas
Protected areas established in 1943
National Natural Landmarks in Texas
1943 establishments in Texas